Eduards Emsis (born 23 February 1996) is a Latvian international footballer who plays for Albanian club Egnatia Rrogozhinë, as a midfielder.

Club career
He has played club football for FS METTA/Latvijas Universitāte.

Emsis joined FK Jelgava for the 2019 season.

On 17 January 2020, FC Noah announced the signing of Emsis.

On 21 January 2022, he signed with Lahti in Finland for the 2022 season.

International career
He made his international debut for the Latvia in 2018.

References

1996 births
Living people
Latvian footballers
Latvia international footballers
Association football midfielders
FS METTA/Latvijas Universitāte players
FK Jelgava players
FC Noah players
FC Lahti players
KS Egnatia Rrogozhinë players
Latvian Higher League players
Armenian Premier League players
Latvian expatriate footballers
Expatriate footballers in Armenia
Latvian expatriate sportspeople in Armenia
Expatriate footballers in Finland
Latvian expatriate sportspeople in Finland
Expatriate footballers in Albania
Latvian expatriates in Albania
Veikkausliiga players